"Cosmotheism" is a term which refers to the idea that the entire universe (kosmos) is God (theos). It is thus similar to pantheism and the idea of the anima mundi (world-soul). The term was coined by Lamoignon de Malesherbes (1721–1794) to refer to the Stoic worship of the cosmos or mundus as a Supreme Being. Jan Assmann ascribed the doctrine to ancient Egyptian theology as well as various Greek philosophies. According to Assman, "Malesherbes could not have found a better term for what seems to be the common denominator of Egyptian religion, Alexandrinian (Neoplatonic, Stoic, Hermetic) philosophy, and Spinozism, including the medieval traditions such as alchemy and the cabala that have served as intermediaries." Assman also sees cosmotheistic ideas in the German Romanticism of figures like Goethe and Schiller.

The term is associated with the beliefs of various modern individuals, including:

 Norman Lowell, the Maltese founder of Imperium Europa
 Mordechai Nessyahu, a Jewish-Israeli and a Labor Party theorist
 William Luther Pierce, an American far-right political activist, neo-Nazi and white supremacist who founded the National Alliance and led it for almost thirty years

References

Pantheism